Serge Kujawa (November 25, 1924 – September 22, 2014) was a Canadian politician and lawyer. He served in the Legislative Assembly of Saskatchewan from 1991 to 1995, as a New Democratic Party member for the constituency of Regina Albert South. He was born in 1925 in Radin, Poland and came to Canada at the age of 3, in 1928. He attended the University of Saskatchewan where he earned a Bachelor of Arts (1957) and Bachelor of Laws (1958) degree. Kujawa became a prosecutor in the Saskatchewan Department of Justice, and rose to great eminence, arguing many cases before the Supreme Court of Canada. He achieved national fame by overseeing the investigation of Saskatchewan politician Colin Thatcher after the murder of Thatcher's ex-wife in 1983; and then, in 1984, by successfully prosecuting Thatcher for first degree  murder. Kujawa married Betty Brydges in 1954 and had six children. He died in 2014, aged 89.

Electoral history 

|-
 
| style="width: 130px" |NDP
|Serge Kujawa
|align="right"|4,333
|align="right"|46.43%
|align="right"|+8.59

|Jack Klein
|align="right"|1,761
|align="right"|18.86%
|align="right"|-26.12

|Independent
|John O'Donoghue
|align="right"|106
|align="right"|1.14%
|align="right"|–
|- bgcolor="white"
!align="left" colspan=3|Total
!align="right"|9,333
!align="right"|100.00%
!align="right"|

References

Saskatchewan New Democratic Party MLAs
1924 births
2014 deaths
Polish emigrants to Canada
Politicians from Regina, Saskatchewan